Laurence or Lawrence Parsons may refer to:

 Laurence Parsons, 1st Earl of Rosse (1749–1807), Irish peer and politician
 Lawrence Parsons, 2nd Earl of Rosse (1758–1841), Irish peer
 Lawrence Parsons, 4th Earl of Rosse (1840–1908), Irish peer
 Lawrence Michael Parsons, 6th Earl of Rosse (1906–1979), Irish peer
 Laurence Parsons (priest) (1883–1972), Anglican clergyman & grandson of the 3rd Earl of Rosse
 Lawrence Parsons (British Army officer) (1850–1923), British general
 Laurence Parsons (MP), Member of Parliament (MP) elected 1659 from Boroughbridge